Maureen Smith was a third-party candidate for President of the United States in the 1980 presidential election.  She represented the Peace and Freedom Party (United States) and her running mate was Elizabeth Cervantes Barron.  She also served as the chair of the party from 1978 to 1980, 86–88, 90–92. She was also Santa Cruz County chair of the party. 

Smith was a write-in running mate of former Democratic U.S. Senator from Minnesota Eugene McCarthy during his unsuccessful 1988 campaign, where she and McCarthy were on the ballot only in California and got 243 votes.

Family

Maureen is married to Michael J. Smith.

Efforts

Since 2003, Maureen and her husband Mike have worked to ensure that electronic voting machines are required to provide a "paper trail" to verify authentication.

References

Year of birth missing (living people)
Living people
Female candidates for President of the United States
Female candidates for Vice President of the United States
Peace and Freedom Party presidential nominees
Candidates in the 1980 United States presidential election
1988 United States vice-presidential candidates
20th-century American politicians
20th-century American women politicians